The Late Late Show Tribute is an album & film by The Dubliners recorded in 1987. The album charted at No.31 in Ireland.

The set originated as a special dedicated episode of RTE's The Late Late Show, hosted by Gay Byrne, on the occasion of the band's 25th anniversary year. As well as featuring a number of unique collaborations, the episode is notable for hosting the last public appearance of founding band member Ciarán Bourke, who - unable to perform with the band due to health issues - recited "The Lament for Brendan Behan".

Originally released in 1987 on VHS in PAL format, the episode was re-released on DVD in 2008, and also as a stand-alone album on CD the same year.

Track list
 "Seven Drunken Nights" - The Dubliners
 "I Loved the Ground She Walked Upon" - Jim McCann With The Dubliners
 "Dreaming My Dreams" - The Fureys & Davey Arthur
 "Scorn Not His Simplicity" - Luke Kelly (archival footage)
 "Luke - a Tribute" - Christy Moore With The Dubliners
 "The Irish Rover" - The Pogues With The Dubliners
 "The Marino Waltz" - The Dubliners
 "The Humours of Glendart/Saddle the Pony/Brian O'Lynn" - The Fureys & Davey Arthur With The Dubliners
 "Now I'm Easy" - Stockton's Wing With Ronnie Drew
 "Springhill Mining Disaster" - U2
 "Don't Get Married Girls" - The Dubliners
 "McAlpine's Fusiliers" - The Dubliners
 "The Black Velvet Band" - Christy Moore With The Dubliners
 "Lament for Brendan Behan" - Ciáran Bourke
 "The Auld Triangle" - Everybody

Chart performance

References

The Dubliners live albums
Dubliners